The 2011 edition of the Carrera Panamericana Mexican sports car racing event started in Huatulco, Oaxaca and finished in Zacatecas, Zacatecas. This edition was composed by 7 stages. The race started in October 21 and finished in October 27.

Route

The 2011 edition traveled through eight states: started in Oaxaca and passed by, Puebla, Hidalgo, Querétaro,  Michoacán, Guanajuato, Aguascalientes, and finished in Zacatecas.

Participants

At least 75 drivers from México, USA, Canada, Sweden, Belgium and Germany took part in this edition. Douglas Mockett (2002 champion) raced in this edition. Ex-Formula one Jochen Mass raced this year in a Ford Mustang. Mexican drivers as Michel Jourdain Jr. (Champ Car, WRC) and Ricardo Triviño (WRC), eventual winner, also took part in this edition.

Results

Overall

By Class

Stages

By day

Day 0

The preclassification consisted in a 30.2 km stage around Huatulco. There was a special stage of 8.12 km. The route took the Huatulco freeway to Salina Cruz and returned by Conejos beach. As this stage was optional, only 87 of 112 drivers took the start. There were four accidents, but no consequences.

Day 1

The first stage began in Huatulco in direction to Oaxaca de Juárez. This stage passed by Salina Cruz, Santo Domingo Tehuantepec, Santa María Jalapa del Marqués, San Pedro Totolapa, Tlacolula de Matamoros. Competitors ran 401 km, 137 km in 10 special stages. The finish was in the Zocalo of Oaxaca.

Day 2

The second stage began in Oaxaca de Juárez and finished in Puebla. This day the Carrera pass only for Oaxaca and Puebla states. Huajuapan de León and Tehuacán were the main cities visited.

Day 3

The third stage began in Puebla and finished in Santiago de Querétaro. Ricardo Triviño finished the stage with the best time but received one minute of penalization.

Day 4

The second stage began in Santiago de Querétaro and finished in Morelia

Day 5
The second stage began in Morelia and finished in Guanajuato

Day 6
The second stage began in Guanajuato and finished in Aguascalientes

Day 7
The second stage began in Aguascalientes and finished in Zacatecas

References

Carrera Panamericana
Carrera Panamericana
Carrera Pana